Serene Watson (born 3 November 2001) is an Australian rules footballer playing for St Kilda in the AFL Women's competition (AFLW). She has previously played for the Gold Coast.

Early life
Watson was born in Sydney, New South Wales and moved to the Gold Coast at eight years of age. She attended Helensvale State High School throughout her upbringing and began playing junior football with the Broadbeach Cats. She later switched to play for the Bond University and became a dual All-Australian at the under-18 level in 2018 and 2019.

AFLW career
Watson became the first women's player ever drafted by the Gold Coast Suns when she was selected with the 18th pick in the 2019 AFL Women's draft. She made her AFLW debut against Greater Western Sydney in round 1 of the 2020 AFL Women's season.

At the end of season seven, Watson was traded to St Kilda as part of a five-club deal.

Personal life
Watson's partner Madison Prespakis also plays in the AFLW, for Essendon.

Statistics 
Statistics are correct to the end of the 2020 season.

|- style="background-color:#EAEAEA"
! scope="row" style="text-align:center" | 2020
| 
| 14 || 7 || 0 || 0 || 49 || 16 || 65 || 6 || 16 || 0.0 || 0.0 || 7.0 || 2.3 || 9.3 || 0.9 || 2.3 || 
|- class="sortbottom"
! colspan=3 | Career
! 7
! 0
! 0
! 49
! 16
! 65 
! 6 
! 16 
! 0.0
! 0.0 
! 7.0
! 2.3
! 9.3
! 0.9
! 2.3
! 
|}

References

External links 

2001 births
Living people
Sportspeople from the Gold Coast, Queensland
Sportswomen from Queensland
Australian rules footballers from Queensland
Gold Coast Football Club (AFLW) players
Lesbian sportswomen
Australian LGBT sportspeople
LGBT players of Australian rules football